Alberto Martín was the defending champion but decided not to participate this year.
Fabio Fognini won the Italian final, where he defeated Potito Starace 6–4, 6–1.

Seeds

Draw

Finals

Top half

Bottom half

References
Main Draw
Qualifying Singles

AON Open Challenger - Singles
AON Open Challenger
AON